The CM-12 Tank is a modified M48A3 made for the Republic of China Army situated on Taiwan. The Armored Vehicle Development Center (AVDC) used the extra 100 fire-control system units from the production of the CM-11 Brave Tiger to modify the existing M48A3 tanks of the ROC Army. The modification was completed as of 1993. The CM-12 can be distinguished from the CM-11 by the rounded glacis plates, and from the M48A3 by the 105mm M68A1 cannon, which is longer than the 90mm T139/M3A1 cannon on the M48A3 and lacks a muzzle brake, and by the different commander's cupola.

Modifications 
The CM-12 program selected some M48A3 hulls and replaced the petrol engines with diesel engines, installed a new transmission, replaced the tracks, and replaced the turret with the CM-11's turret. The modified tank was renamed CM-12.

During the Brave Tiger (CM-11) upgrade program, AVDC received an M48A5 for reference. The idea of the CM-12 was derived from the M48A5. The exterior of CM-12 and M48A5 are similar, but the interior is completely different; the main difference being that replacing the original engine and turret of the M48A3 cost interior fuel capacity, decreasing its range. The CM-12 also has an upgraded fire-control system due to it using the same turret as the CM-11. The M48A5 has no upgraded fire-control system. 

The armament of CM-12 is identical to CM-11's. The main cannon is an M68A1 105mm cannon, which can fire ammunition such as armour-piercing fin-stabilized discarding-sabot (APFSDS) Rounds. It can carry up to 60 rounds on board. One M2HB machine gun is mounted on the commander's cupola, one T74 machine gun on the gunner's cupola, and one coaxial M240 machine gun inside the turret. 

The protection on CM-12 is outdated, being unable to stop shells fired from the 125mm smoothbore cannon mounted on tanks used by the Chinese People's Liberation Army such as the Type 96, and the material used is inferior to that used on newer tanks, being made of cast steel instead of more modern composite materials. After the great disarmament of Ching Shih (精實案) and Ching Chin (精進案), the existing CM-11 and M60A3 TTS tanks are enough for the ROCA, and almost half of the CM-12s are now retired.

References

External links 
-Defense News: Taiwan CM12 V.S. Korean M48A5K
Military Factory

Post–Cold War main battle tanks
Armoured fighting vehicles of the Republic of China
Military vehicles introduced in the 1990s